Abhai may refer to:

Abhai (pentagraph), a single specific sound (phoneme) in the Irish language

Among saints:
Abhai (saint), patron saint against poisonous reptiles
Abhai (teacher), the teacher of Abhai the general and a Christian saint
Abhai the general, a Persian Christian martyr
Abhai of Hach, abbot and saint of the Syriac Orthodox Church
Mar Abhai, a saint of the Syriac Orthodox Church